The 2018 Historic Grand Prix of Monaco was the eleventh running of the Historic Grand Prix of Monaco, a motor racing event for heritage Grand Prix, Voiturettes, Formula One, Formula Two and Sports cars.

Report 
Race A was restored to full race status at the request of the drivers, having been held as a demonstration in 2016. The opening ceremony featured a rare appearance by the Lamborghini Marzal concept car, driven by Prince Albert II.

Three parades were held throughout the weekend:
 A motorcycle parade to celebrate the 70th anniversary of the only Motorcycle Grand Prix held at Monaco on 17 May 1948, featuring MotoGP world champion and Monaco resident Wayne Gardner.
 A celebration of the 70th Anniversary of Porsche, featuring Jacky Ickx in his 1981 Le Mans winning Porsche 936, and his daughter Vanina driving a Porsche F1 car.
 An F1 heritage parade, with drivers including John Watson, Emanuele Pirro, Josh Hill (son of Damon), Mika Häkkinen (1998 Monaco winner), Eddie Irvine, Thierry Boutsen, Karun Chandhok and Riccardo Patrese (1982 Monaco winner).

Results

Summary

Série A: Pre-war Grand Prix Cars

Série B: Pre-1961 F1 and F2 Grand Prix Cars

Série C: Sports racing cars - front engine (1952–1957)

Série D: F1 Grand Prix cars (1961–1965)

Série E: F1 Grand Prix cars (1966–1972)

Série F: F1 Grand Prix cars (1973–1976)

Série G: F1 Grand Prix cars (1977–1980)

References 

2018 in motorsport
Historic motorsport events
Monaco Grand Prix